is a public university in Shunan, Yamaguchi, Japan, established as a private university in 1971. It was formerly called Tokuyama University, but was transferred into a public university in 2022.

Organisation and administration 
The University has two faculties:

Department of Economics
Department of Contemporary Economics
Contemporary Economics Course
Community Economics Course
Finance Course
Department of Business Strategy
Business management courses
Intellectual property development courses
Sports Management Course
Department of Welfare and Information Studies
Department of Human Communication
Social Welfare Course
Social Welfare Course
Welfare Course
Lifelong Sports Course
Information and Communication Course
Media Information Course
Psychology Major
Department of Nursing Course（2024-）

Junior college

The junior college  was founded in 1987 and closed in 2004.

Notable alumni
 Bad Luck Fale (Real Name: Simi Taitoko Fale), Tongan-New Zealand professional wrestler and former rugby union player (NJPW)
 SHO (Real Name: Sho Tanaka, Nihongo: 田中 翔, Tanaka Shō), Japanese professional wrestler and former Greco-Roman wrestler (NJPW)
 Shunsuke Yamamoto (Nihongo: 山本 駿亮, Yamamoto Shunsuke), Japanese footballer (J3 League, Kagoshima United FC)
 Tsutomu Fujimura (Nihongo: 藤村 勉, Fujimura Tsutomu), Japanese Greco-Roman wrestler
 Tsuyoshi Fujitake (Nihongo: 藤武 剛, Fujitake Tsuyoshi), Japanese footballer (J3 League, Tegevajaro Miyazaki)

External links
  Official website

Educational institutions established in 1971
Public universities in Japan
Shūnan, Yamaguchi
Universities and colleges in Yamaguchi Prefecture

1971 establishments in Japan